Anne Wright may refer to:

Anne Wright (author) (1793–1861), British author
Anne Wright (historian) (born 1926), Scottish historian and academic
Anne Wright (lecturer) (born 1946), British academic
Anne St. Clair Wright (1910–1993), American preservationist